The Rural Municipality of Morris No. 312 is a rural municipality (RM) in the Canadian province of Saskatchewan within Census Division No. 11 and  Division No. 5.

History 
The RM of Morris No. 312 incorporated as a rural municipality on December 13, 1909.

Geography 
Notable geographical features in the RM include Little Manitou Lake, Zelma Reservoir, and the Allan Hills.

Communities and localities 
The following urban municipalities are surrounded by the RM.

Towns
Watrous

Villages
Young
Zelma

Resort villages
Manitou Beach

The following unincorporated communities are within the RM.

Localities
 Ancram
 Plassey
 Renown
 Xena

Demographics 

Government 
The RM of Morris No. 312 is governed by an elected municipal council and an appointed administrator that meets on the second Tuesday of every month. The reeve of the RM is Robert Penrose while its administrator is Belinda Rowan. The RM's office is located in Young.

References 

M